The Land of Arlon (Luxembourgish/, ; , ; Dutch: Land van Aarlen ) is the traditionally Luxembourgish-speaking part of Belgian Lorraine, which is now predominantly French-speaking. Arlon is the main city of this region.

The area has borders with the Gaume to the west and with the Grand-Duchy of Luxembourg to the east. It lies to the south of the Ardennes. It coincides largely with the arrondissement of Arlon, part of the province of Luxembourg.

Languages

In the Land of Arlon, the traditional language is Luxembourgish, which is also spoken in the adjacent Grand-Duchy of Luxembourg. In 1990, the French Community of Belgium recognised the regional languages on its territory, of which Luxembourgish is one; however, it did not take any further measures.

Linguistic census results 
The following data are the linguistic results of the census as they appeared in the Belgian Official Journal. Here the language shift from Luxembourgish to French is clearly visible.
 NL: Dutch
 FR: French
 DE: German (to be interpreted as Luxembourgish)

Language that is mostly or exclusively spoken

Known languages

Municipalities and villages in Arelerland

These are the municipalities, with their sections and villages, in the Land of Arlon.
 Municipality of Arlon (Arel)
 Arlon (Arel): Clairefontaine (Badebuerg), Fouches (Affen), Sampont (Sues), Sesselich (Siesselech)
 Autelbas (Nidderälter): Autelhaut (Uewerälter), Barnich (Barnech), Stehnen (Stienen), Sterpenich (Sterpenech), Weyler (Weller)
 Bonnert (Bunnert): Frassem (Fruessem), Seymerich (Seimerech), Viville (Alenuewen), Waltzing (Walzeng)
 Guirsch (Giisch): Heckbous (Heckbus)
 Heinsch (Häischel): Freylange (Frällen), Schoppach (Schappech), Stockem (Stackem)
 Toernich (Ternech): Udange (Eiden)
 Municipality of Attert (Atert)
 Attert (Atert): Grendel (Grendel), Luxeroth (Luxeroth), Post, Schadeck (Schuedeck), Schockville (Schakeler)
 Nobressart (Gehaanselchert): Almeroth (Almeroth), Heinstert (Heeschtert)
 Nothomb (Noutem): Parette (Parrt), Rodenhoff (Roudenhaff)
 Thiaumont (Diddebuerg): Lischert (Leschert)
 Tontelange (Tontel): Metzert (Metzert)
 Municipality of Aubange (Éibeng)
 Aubange (Éibeng)
 Athus (Attem): Guerlange (Gierleng)
 Halanzy (Hueldang): Aix-sur-Cloie (Esch-op-der Huurt), Battincourt (Beetem)
 Rachecourt (Réissech)
 Municipality of Martelange (Maartel): Grumelange, Radelange
 Municipality of Messancy (Miezeg)
 Messancy (Miezeg):  Differt (Déifert), Longeau (Laser), Turpange (Tiirpen)
 Habergy (Hiewerdang): Bébange (Bieben), Guelff (Gielef)
 Hondelange (Hondeleng)
 Sélange (Séilen)
 Wolkrange (Woulker): Buvange (Béiwen)
 Sections of municipalities that are not completely part of Arelerland
 Hachy (Häerzeg), section of the municipality of Habay
 Tintange (Tënnen), section of the municipality Fauvillers
 Bodange (Biedeg)
 Warnach (Warnech)
 Wisembach (Wiisbech)

Notes

External links

  Website about Arelerland
  Learn Luxembourgish

Arlon
Geography of Luxembourg (Belgium)
Regions of Wallonia
Areas of Belgium